Dave Gaudreau,  is a former Canadian politician, who served in the Legislative Assembly of Manitoba from 2011 to 2016. He represented the electoral district of St. Norbert as a member of the Manitoba New Democratic Party caucus.

Electoral results

Provincial

Federal

References

External links
 

Living people
Franco-Manitoban people
New Democratic Party candidates for the Canadian House of Commons
New Democratic Party of Manitoba MLAs
Politicians from Winnipeg
21st-century Canadian politicians
Year of birth missing (living people)